Thangar Bachan (born 1961) is an Indian film director and actor, cinematographer and novelist. He has served as jury member in National Film Awards.

Early life
Thankar Bachan was born in Pathirakottai, a village near Panruti, Cuddalore district, Tamil Nadu.

Career
Bachan started his career as a cinematographer in debut film Malai Charal. He was known for his work in Mogamul, Bharathi and Kadhal Kottai. He made his directorial debut in Azhagi.

Apart from films he occasionally contribute on literary works. His novels include Onbathu Roobai Nottu and Ammavin Kai Pesi. He eventually made these novel into films in his own direction.

Thankar Bachan was known for his contribution in portraying North Tamil Nadu villages which was not depicted in Tamil cinema properly. His story plots were set mostly at Panruti and surrounding villages. After Bharathiraja, villages were best portrayed in Thangar Bachan movies. Bharathiraja himself declared that after him Bachan directs the best village films.

Filmography

As director

As actor 
 Chidambarathil Oru Appasamy (2005) as Elangovan
 Pallikoodam (2007) as Kumarasamy
 Ammavin Kaipesi (2012) as Prasad
 Merlin (2018)

As Cinematographer only 
 Malai Charal (1990)
 Dharma Seelan (1991)
 Madhumathi (1992)
 Mogamul (1993)
 Veettai Paaru Naattai Paaru (1994)
 Malappuram Haji Mahanaya Joji (1994) (Malayalam film)
 Vaanmathi (1995)
 Vaazhga Jananayagam (1995)
 Karuvelam Pookkal (1996)
 Kadhal Kottai (1996)
 Kaalamellam Kadhal Vaazhga (1997)
 Kaadhale Nimmadhi (1998)
 Sirf Tum (1998) (Hindi film)
 Marumalarchi (1998)
 Kannedhirey Thondrinal (1999)
 Kanave Kalaiyadhe (1999)
 Kallazhagar (1999)
 Unnudan (1999)
 Bharathi (2000)
 Kannukku Kannaga (2000)
 James Pandu (2000)
 Kutti (2001)
 Pandavar Bhoomi (2001)
 Periyar (2007)

Bibliography

Novels
 Onbathu Roobai Nottu, 1996
 Ammavin Kai Pesi, 2009

Short story collections
 Vellai Maadu, 1993
 Kodi Munthiri, 2002
 Isaikaatha Isaithattu, 2006
 Thangar Bachan Kathaigal
Solla Thonuthu- A collection of 50 articles published in Tamil Hindu daily news paper- 2015

Awards

 1993 – Lilli Deivasigamani Memorial Award for Best Short Story Collection (Vellai Maadu)
 1996 – Tamil Nadu Government's Award for Best Novel (Onbathu Rubai Nottu)
 1996 – Agni Akshara Award for Best Novel (Onbathu Rubai Nottu)
 1996 – Thiruppur Tamil Sangam Award for Best Novel (Onbathu Rubai Nottu)
 1997 – Tamil Nadu State Film Award for Best Cinematographer (Film – Kaalamellam Kadhal Vazhga)
 1998 – "Kalaimamani" Award – awarded by the Government of Tamil Nadu for Contributions in Tamil cinema
 2002 – GV SICA Award for Best Director (Film – Azhagi)
 2005 – Jaya TV Award for Best Actor (Film – Chidambarathil Oru Appasamy)
 2007 – Tamil Nadu State Raja Sando Award for Contribution in Film direction
 2007 – Santhome Communication Award for Best Director (Film – Onbadhu Roobai Nottu)
 2007 – Sathyan Memorial Film Award for Best Director (Tamil) (Film –  Pallikoodam)
 2007 – GV SICA Award for Best Story Dialogues (Film – Pallikoodamm)
2007 - Tamil Nadu State Film Award for Best Director for Pallikoodamm)
2015 - Best literary Athiththanar Award for "Thankar Bachan Kathaigal" - A Short Story Collection.

References

External links
 
 Official website
 Interview to TamilAustralian

1962 births
Living people
Tamil screenwriters
Film directors from Tamil Nadu
Tamil film directors
Tamil-language film directors
Indian male film actors
Tamil male actors
Tamil film cinematographers
Tamil-language writers
Tamil Nadu State Film Awards winners
M.G.R. Government Film and Television Training Institute alumni
Recipients of the Kalaimamani Award
People from Cuddalore district
Male actors from Tamil Nadu
20th-century Indian male actors
Cinematographers from Tamil Nadu
21st-century Indian film directors
Tamil film producers
Film producers from Tamil Nadu